Miss Thailand 2023 (Thai: นางสาวไทย 2566) was the 54th edition of Miss Thailand beauty pageant organized by TPN Global Co., Ltd. under cooperation with Tero Entertainment. The pageant scheduled to be held at Chaeng Watthana Hall, Central Chaeng Watthana, Nonthaburi on 19 March 2023, while the initial pageant activities was decided to be done in the province of Phatthalung. This year, representatives from 47 provinces have been selected Manita Farmer of Phuket crowned her successor Chonnikarn Supittayaporn of Chiang Mai at the end of the event. Chonnikarn will represent Thailand at Miss World 2023 in the United Arab Emirates.

Final results 

Color keys
  The contestant won in an International pageant.
  The contestant was a Finalist/Runner-up in an International pageant.
  The contestant was a Semi-Finalist in an International pageant.
  The contestant did not place.

§ Placed into the Top 11 by Fast Track

Special Awards 
. Unreferenced material may be removed at any time per WP:V

Candidates
46 contestants will compete for the title.

See also
 Miss World 2023

References

External links

Beauty pageants in Thailand
2023 beauty pageants